The Westland Wapiti was a British two-seat general-purpose military single-engined biplane of the 1920s. It was designed and built by Westland Aircraft Works to replace the Airco DH.9A in Royal Air Force service.

First flying in 1927, the Wapiti entered service with the RAF in 1928, and remained in production until 1932, a total of 565 being built. It equipped twenty squadrons of the RAF, both overseas (particularly in India and Iraq) and at home, remaining in RAF service until 1940, also being used by the Air Forces of Australia, Canada, South Africa and India. It also formed the basis for the Westland Wallace which partly replaced the Wapiti in RAF use.

The Wapiti is named for the wapiti, also known as elk, one of the largest species of the deer family and one of the largest land mammals in North America and eastern Asia.

Design and development

In 1927, the British Air Ministry issued Specification 26/27 for a replacement of the elderly Airco DH.9A, designed during the First World War which still equipped the Royal Air Force's General Purpose squadrons. To save time and money, the specification called for the use of a high proportion of DH.9A components, (as the RAF still held large stores of DH.9A spares), while it encouraged the use of an all-metal structure. A large number of types were tendered to meet this requirement from most of the major British aircraft manufacturers, including Westland, who submitted the design that later became known as the Wapiti. Westland had an advantage in that it had carried out the detailed design work for the DH.9A, and was already a major contractor for the DH.9A.

The Wapiti was a conventional single-engined equal-span two-bay biplane with a slight wing stagger. It had tandem open cockpits and a fixed main undercarriage plus a tailskid. The forward fuselage was of metal tube structure with aluminium-and-fabric covering, while the rear fuselage was of fabric-covered wooden construction.  The wings and tail were standard wooden DH.9A components, although later models replaced the wooden parts with an all-metal structure.  The Wapiti was powered by a single Bristol Jupiter radial engine, and its crew of two were armed with a forward-firing Vickers machine gun and a Lewis gun for the observer, while it could carry up to 580 lb (264 kg) of bombs under the wings and fuselage.  It was also fitted with radio and photographic cameras, and like the DH.9A before it, could carry a spare wheel for operations in adverse terrain.

The prototype first flew on 7 March 1927. Initial tests showed poor control, and the prototype was modified with a much larger tail and horn-balanced ailerons, solving these problems.  (It was later discovered that a 2-foot (0.61 m) fuselage section had been omitted from the prototype – as handling was now acceptable, it was not reinstated.)  The Wapiti performed well during RAF trials, while using significant amounts of DH.9A components, and was declared the winner of the competition, an initial contract for 25 aircraft being placed in October 1927.

After initial production, the wooden fuselage, tail and wings were replaced by metal structures in the Wapiti II and IIA, and the original long fuselage was eventually reinstated in the Wapiti V and later versions.  In 1930, Westland produced an updated version of the Wapiti, the Wapiti VII, which differed so much that it was renamed the Westland Wallace.

Operational history

The type entered service with No. 84 Squadron RAF in Iraq in June 1928. It was heavily used in Iraq and India in the Army Cooperation role, acting also sometimes as a bomber or reconnaissance aircraft.  Wapitis of No. 20 squadron escorted Victoria troop carriers in the evacuation of Kabul in December 1928.  It was still in service in India until 1942.  In Britain, Wapitis served with the Auxiliary Air Force from 1929 to 1937. It was also flown by Australia and Canada, where it saw service at the start of the Second World War.

The prototype Wapiti V, registered G-AAWA, was used for demonstration flights in Argentina and Uruguay on floats, powered by a 550 hp Armstrong Siddeley Panther IIA engine. It was later modified as the Bristol Pegasus-powered Westland PV-6 or Wapiti VII, re-registered G-ACBR (also known as the Houston-Wallace after the patron Lucy, Lady Houston), for an attempt to fly over Mount Everest. Flown by Flt Lt David F. McIntyre and accompanied by a Westland PV-3 the two aircraft became the first to fly over Mount Everest on 3 April 1933. The PV-6 was later designated the Wallace Mk I, bearing serial K3488 which introduced a number of improvements. A total of 68 Wapitis were converted to Wallace Mk I standard.

The Wapiti was used by the Indian Air Force into the early days of the Second World War.  For example, during the Imperial Japanese Navy attack on Ceylon (now Sri Lanka), The Indian Air Force sent 2 Wapitis to patrol off the east coast of India, looking for the Japanese fleet.  The southern patrolling Wapiti found nothing.  But the northern patrolling Wapiti actually found a Japanese task force including the aircraft carrier Ryujo, and then amazingly survived to land undamaged.

Military operators

 Royal Australian Air Force – 44 Wapitis were in service from 1929 to 1944.
 No. 1 Squadron RAAF
 No. 3 Squadron RAAF
 No. 1 Flying Training School RAAF
 Central Flying School RAAF

 Royal Canadian Air Force
 No. 3 Squadron RCAF
 No. 10 Squadron RCAF
 No. 100 Squadron RCAF
 No. 118 Squadron RCAF

Chinese Nationalist Air Force

Hejaz Air Force

India
Royal Indian Air Force
No. 1 Squadron, Indian Air Force
No. 2 Squadron, Indian Air Force
No. 7 Squadron, Indian Air Force
No. 1 Air Gunnery School (India)
No. 1 AACU
No. 2 AACU
No. 3 AACU
No.1 Coastal Defence Flight, IAFVR
No.2 Coastal Defence Flight, IAFVR
No.4 Coastal Defence Flight, IAFVR (Later No. 104 (GR) Squadron, Indian Air Force )
No.5 Coastal Defence Flight, IAFVR
No.6 Coastal Defence Flight, IAFVR

South African Air Force

 Royal Air Force
(in India)
 No. 5 Squadron RAF from 1931 to 1940
 No. 11 Squadron RAF from 1928 to 1932
 No. 20 Squadron RAF from 1932 to 1935
 No. 27 Squadron RAF from 1930 to 1940
 No. 28 Squadron RAF from 1931 to 1936
 No. 31 Squadron RAF from 1931 to 1939
 No. 60 Squadron RAF from 1930 to 1939
(in Iraq)
 No. 30 Squadron RAF from 1929 to 1935
 No. 39 Squadron RAF from 1929 to 1931
 No. 55 Squadron RAF from 1930 to 1937
 No. 84 Squadron RAF from 1928 to 1935
(in the United Kingdom)
 No. 24 Squadron RAF from 1924 to 1930 at RAF Northolt
 No. 501 Squadron RAF from 1930 to 1933 at RAF Filton
 No. 600 Squadron RAF from 1929 to 1935 at RAF Hendon
 No. 601 Squadron RAF from 1929 to 1933 at RAF Hendon
 No. 602 Squadron RAF from 1929 to 1934 at RAF Renfrew then RAF Abbotsinch
 No. 603 Squadron RAF from 1930 to 1934 at RAF Turnhouse
 No. 604 Squadron RAF from 1930 to 1934 at RAF Hendon
 No. 605 Squadron RAF from 1930 to 1934 at RAF Castle Bromwich
 No. 607 Squadron RAF from 1932 to 1937 at RAF Usworth
 No. 608 Squadron RAF from 1930 to 1937 at RAF Thornaby

Variants
All built by Westland at Yeovil

 Wapiti I – Initial production version for the RAF. Wooden structure. Powered by a 420 hp (313 kW) Bristol Jupiter VI radial piston engine. 25 built for RAF.
 Wapiti IA – Improved version for the RAAF. Powered by a 480 hp (358 kW) geared Bristol Jupiter VIIIF radial piston engine and divided-axle main undercarriage. 28 built.
 Wapiti IB – Similar to the Wapiti IA. Four exported to South Africa. Later re-engined with the 525 hp (392 kW) Armstrong Siddeley Panther. Increased fuel.
 Wapiti II – Pre-production version with all-metal rear fuselage and wing structure replacing wooden structures of Wapiti I. Powered by Jupiter VIII engine. 10 built.
 Wapiti IIA – Major production version with tropical equipment and partial dual controls, and able to use wheel or float landing gear. Initially powered by Jupiter VIII. 430 built.
 Wapiti III – Two-seat general-purpose biplane for the SAAF based on Wapiti IIA. Powered by 480 hp (358 kW) Armstrong Siddeley Jaguar VI or 550 hp (410 kW) Panther VI engines. Four built by Westland followed by 27 under licence in SAAF Workshops.
Wapiti IV – Project for Hispano-Suiza 12N powered aircraft with long fuselage for Spain. One long fuselage aircraft designated Wapiti IV may have been delivered to  Chinese Warlord Zhang Xueliang in 1931.
 Wapiti V – Long-fuselage army cooperation version for RAF, fitted with message pickup hook, stronger undercarriage and powered by a 600 hp (448 kW) Jupiter VIIIF. 35 built.
 Wapiti VI – Unarmed dual control training version for the RAF. 16 built.
 Wapiti VII – Converted Wapiti V prototype, original designated the Houston-Wallace P.V.6 before reconversion to Wapiti VII experimental aircraft.
 Wapiti VIII – Long fuselage version for Central Chinese government. Powered by a Panther IIA, four built.

Survivors

A Westland Wapiti (Serial Number K-813) survives at the Indian Air Force Museum, Palam, Delhi. It is the last surviving aircraft of the type. The fuselage and lower wing of one other (Serial Number K-811) were reported as surviving at the museum's storage facility, but in June 2012 it was determined that only K-811's lower wing survives, albeit in a ruinous condition.

Specifications (Wapiti IIA)

See also

References

Notes

Bibliography

External links

Westland Wapiti – British Aircraft Directory
Wapiti in Canadian service
Westland Wapati – British Aircraft of World War II

1920s British bomber aircraft
Wapiti